Mary Ellis Peltz (4 May 1896 – 24 October 1981) was an American drama and music critic, magazine editor, poet and writer on music. Born Mary Ellis Opdycke, Peltz was educated at the Spence School and Barnard College (Phi Beta Kappa). At the age of 24 she joined the staff of The New York Sun as assistant music critic. She left the paper in 1924 at the time of her marriage to John DeWitt Peltz. She later worked for The Junior League Magazine as a drama critic and published both poetry and articles in a variety of publications; including Harper's Magazine and Poetry. In 1936 she became the first chief editor of Opera News, a position she held until 1957 when she founded the Metropolitan Opera's archives. She served as director of the Met's  archives from 1957 to 1981.

External links
 
Obituary at New York Times

References

1896 births
1981 deaths
American magazine editors
American music critics
20th-century American poets
Barnard College alumni
American women editors
American women journalists
American women poets
American women music critics
20th-century American women writers
Women writers about music
Spence School alumni
20th-century American non-fiction writers
Women magazine editors
Burials at Green-Wood Cemetery